Blue Lake may refer to:

Places 
Australia
 Blue Lake (New South Wales)
 Blue Lake (Queensland)
 Blue Lake National Park, a former protected area in Queensland 
 Blue Lake / Warwar, South Australia

Croatia
 Blue Lake (Croatia)

New Zealand
 Blue Lake (Bay of Plenty)
 Blue Lake (Canterbury)
 Blue Lake (Otago)
 Blue Lake (Tasman)
 Blue Lake (Raoul Island), in the Kermadec Islands

Romania
 Blue Lake (Maramureș County), natural monument, collapsed mine gallery

United States
 Blue Lake (Alaska)
 Arkansas
Blue Lake in Crittenden County, Arkansas
Blue Lake in Lee County, Arkansas
Blue Lake in Ouachita County, Arkansas
Blue Lake in Polk County, Arkansas
Either of two Blue Lakes in Prairie County, Arkansas
Blue Lake in Union County, Arkansas
Blue Lake in Woodruff County, Arkansas
 California
 Blue Lake, California – a city in Humboldt County
 Blue Lakes (California) – a string of lakes in Lake County
 Blue Lake (Madera County, California)
 Florida
 Blue Lake, north of Lake Placid, Florida
 Blue Lake (Sebring, Florida)
 Indiana
 Blue Lake, Indiana
 Blue Lake, Indianapolis, Indiana
 Michigan
 Blue Lake (Michigan)
 Blue Lake Township, Kalkaska County, Michigan
 Blue Lake Township, Muskegon County, Michigan
 Blue Lake (Hubbard County, Minnesota)
 Blue Lake (New Mexico)
 Blue Lake (Utah)
 Blue Lake Regional Park in Fairview, Oregon
 Blue Lake (Oregon)
 Blue Lake, in Grant County, Washington, north of Soap Lake, Washington

Other 
 a variety of Green beans
 Blue Lake Fine Arts Camp in Twin Lake, Michigan
 Blue Lake (album), live album by Don Cherry released in 1974

See also 
 Blue Lakes
 Blausee (Blue Lake) in Switzerland
 Qinghai
 Lake Göygöl